= Seema Kapur Chhibber =

1960s Indian cabaret dancer

Seema Kapoor (Hindi: सीमा कपूर) is an Indian actress, dancer and model from the 1970s and '80s.
